Jaroslav Balaštík (born November 28, 1979) is a Czech former professional ice hockey player who most notably played with HC Zlin in the Czech Extraliga and the Columbus Blue Jackets in the National Hockey League (NHL).

Playing career
Coming through the Czech professional hockey ranks Balaštík was drafted as an overage player in the 6th round, 184th overall in the 2002 NHL Entry Draft. After playing eight seasons (1997–2005) with HC Zlín in the Czech Extraliga, and part of one season (2002–03) with HPK in the Finnish SM-liiga; Balaštík started 2005 season with the Syracuse Crunch, the Blue Jackets' American Hockey League affiliate. He was quickly promoted to the big club, where he became somewhat of a shootout-specialist, going 6-for-9 for the season.

In his second season with the Blue Jackets and limited opportunity, on December 13, 2006, Balaštík was released and contracted by the Swedish Jönköping-based club HV71 in the Swedish elite league Elitserien. In HV71, Balaštík played with his fellow countryman Jan Hrdina, with whom he has played previously in Columbus Blue Jackets in NHL.

From 2007–08 he rejoined HC Zlin in the Czech Republic and played 5 of the past 6 seasons with the team, defecting to BK Mlada Boleslav for a single season in 2011–12. He closed out his career after three more seasons with the club, before moving to HC Bílí Tygři Liberec.

Career statistics

Regular season and playoffs

International

Awards
 Named Best Forward in Czech Extraliga in 2004–05.

Records
 Most goals scored in Czech Extraliga in seasons 2003–04 and 2004–05.
 Most points in Czech Extraliga playoffs in season 2003–04.
 Most goals scored in Czech Extraliga playoffs in season 2003–04.

References

External links

1979 births
Living people
HC Bílí Tygři Liberec players
BK Mladá Boleslav players
Columbus Blue Jackets draft picks
Columbus Blue Jackets players
Czech ice hockey right wingers
PSG Berani Zlín players
HPK players
HV71 players
People from Uherské Hradiště
Syracuse Crunch players
Sportspeople from the Zlín Region
Czech expatriate ice hockey players in the United States
Czech expatriate ice hockey players in Finland
Czech expatriate ice hockey players in Sweden